Patron Saint (foaled 1923) was a British racehorse who won the 1928 Cheltenham Gold Cup.

Background
Patron Saint was a bay gelding bred in the United Kingdom. He was sired by St Girons (a son of St Simon) who also sired the Grand Sefton Steeplechase winner Inversible. Patron Saint's dam VCB was a distant descendant of Canezou, who won the 1000 Guineas in 1848 and later became an influential broodmare.

During his racing career Patron Saint was owned by F W Rees and was trained near Bangor-on-Dee in Wales by Stanley Harrison.

Racing career
The early spring of 1928 was exceptionally cold and led to fears that the Cheltenham Festival would be abandoned but a break in the weather allowed the meeting to take place. Patron Saint was entered in the Gold Cup as a five-year-old meaning that he carried seven pounds less than his older rivals. With the leading chaser of the season Easter Hero absent, the 1926 Gold Cup winner Koko started the 4/5 favourite ahead of Patron Saint on 7/2 whilst the most notable of the other five runners was the 1927 Grand National winner Sprig. Ridden by Dick Rees, Patron Saint tracked Koko before being driven up on the inside to take a slight lead at the final fence. Koko still looked the more likely winner but broke a blood vessel and dropped back to third, allowing Patron Saint to draw clear and win by four lengths from the thirteen-year-old veteran Vive. On his next start Patron Saint finished third on a flat race in which he was ridden by Noel Murless, later to become a leading trainer.

Patron Saint was expected to defend his Gold Cup title in 1929 but missed the race after suffering a series of injuries and training problems. He returned in 1930 and won the Plodders Chase at Nottingham Racecourse, but had no further success.

Assessment and honours
In their book, A Century of Champions, based on the Timeform rating system, John Randall and Tony Morris rated Patron Saint a "poor" Gold Cup winner.

Pedigree

Patron Saint was inbred 2 × 4 to Common, meaning that this stallion appears in both the second and fourth generations of his pedigree.

References 

1923 racehorse births
Racehorses bred in the United Kingdom
Racehorses trained in the United Kingdom
Thoroughbred family 31
Cheltenham Gold Cup winners
Cheltenham Festival winners
National Hunt racehorses